Ricardo González Dávila (born May 26, 1972) is a Spanish basketball coach who is currently the head coach of the Tunisia women's national basketball team. He coached North Korea's men's and women's national basketball teams from September to December 2016. He coached the Chilean women's national basketball team from 2013 to 2015.

Coaching career
In 2016, Dávila was hired as the head coach of La Salle-Olympic.

On June 3, 2017, Dávila was hired as the head coach of Skallagrímur of the Úrvalsdeild kvenna. On January 14, Skallagrímur fired Dávila as its head coach. Skallagrímur had lost in the Icelandic Basketball Cup semi-finals two days before and a rift between Dávila and star player Carmen Tyson-Thomas became public after the game.

On January 27, Dávila was hired as a coach to Keflavík's junior basketball teams.

Personal life
Dávila is married to Lidia Mirchandani, a former professional basketball player and former member of the Spanish women's national basketball team.

References

1972 births
Living people
Spanish basketball coaches
Úrvalsdeild kvenna basketball coaches
Spanish expatriate sportspeople in Norway
Skallagrímur women's basketball coaches
Sportspeople from Madrid